Alfred Stern (August 8, 1922 – December 31, 2013) was an entrepreneur, cable television executive, and sat as the director on the boards of PBS, Mount Sinai Hospital and Warner Cable Corporation.

Biography 
Stern was the son of Marion Rosenwald and Alfred Stern Sr., and he was the great-grandson of Julius Rosenwald, a Sears Roebuck partner and Chicago philanthropist.    

Stern served the United States Air Force during WWII after attending Deerfield Academy and the University of North Carolina.  He was married to Joanne Stern, trustee of the Museum of Modern Art in New York City, and later Barbara Biben, a Gannett Co. executive. Stern’s children include Chris Hyman, Cathy Myers as well as Nicholas, Thomas and Margaret Stern, the 2006 Academy Award winner for best animated short.

Career

Television 
Stern was an early advocate of cable television. After serving as NBC’s Vice President, Enterprises Division (1952-1962), he started and chaired the Television Communications Corporation (1962-1975), focusing on cable. Time Warner acquired that company, and Stern took a position as President and CEO of Warner Cable Corporation and Senior Vice President, Corporate Affairs, Warner Communications, Inc (1975-1980). He also served as the Chairman of the National Cable Television Association, where he was named its "Man of the Year", and chairman of the board of directors of the Public Broadcasting System.

Other leadership roles

Chairmanships 
Stern became a trustee of Mount Sinai Hospital in 1963 and then its Chairman of the Board (1977-1985), notably heading up a fund to build Mount Sinai campus’ 26-story Annenberg building. He received an honorary doctorate of Humane Letters from the Mount Sinai School of Medicine.

 Chairman of the Board of the Film Society of Lincoln Center
 Chairman of the Board of the Center for Democracy Studies

Trustee 

 President, board of trustees, Dalton Schools
 Trustee, American Museum of Natural History
 Trustee, New York Public Library
 Trustee, WNET
 Trustee, White House Historical Association (with Barbara Biben)
 Trustee, Radcliffe College, 1979-1981

References 

1922 births
2013 deaths
United States Army Air Forces personnel of World War II
University of North Carolina alumni
American businesspeople